On 8 February 1989, Independent Air Flight 1851, a Boeing 707 on an American charter flight from Bergamo, Italy to Punta Cana, Dominican Republic, struck Pico Alto while on approach to Santa Maria Airport in the Azores for a scheduled stopover. The aircraft was destroyed, with the loss of all 144 people on board, resulting in the deadliest plane crash in Portugal's history. All of the passengers on board were Italian and all of the crew were Americans. The crash is also known as "The disaster of the Azores".

Aircraft and crew 
The aircraft was a 21-year-old Boeing 707 (Serial no. 19572, factory no. 687) that had been built in 1968, and made its first flight on 22 March the same year. It had been previously operated by Trans World Airlines (TWA).

The flight crew consisted of Captain Douglas Leon Daugherty (41), First officer Samuel "Sammy" Adcock (36), and Flight engineer Jorge Gonzalez (34).

Captain Daugherty had 7,766 flight hours, including 766 hours on the Boeing 707 (278 as a first officer and 488 hours as a captain). He also had 2,259 hours on the Boeing 727 (347 hours as a first officer and 1,912 hours as a captain).

First officer Adcock had a total of 3,764 flight hours, though only 64 of them on the Boeing 707. Flight engineer Gonzalez had a total of 6,756 flying hours, including 1,056 hours on the Boeing 707, He also had 2,888 hours on the Boeing 727 and 2,823 hours on the Lockheed C-5 Galaxy.

One of the flight attendants on board, Yvette Murray (26), was engaged to Captain Daugherty, planning to get married in May.

Sequence of events

Preceding events 
The flight crew previously flew on 3 February to Montego Bay, Jamaica. On 4 February they flew to Fort Worth, Texas, then to Denver, Colorado. On 5 February, the crew returned to Montego Bay, where they received their assignment for flight 1851 from Milan, Italy to Punta Cana, Dominican Republic, with a scheduled stopover in Santa Maria, Azores, Portugal. On 7 February, after a flight of 10 hours and 40 minutes, the crew arrived in Genoa, Italy, having to divert from Milan Malpensa Airport due to poor weather. The crew arrived in Bergamo three hours later, which was located near the planned departure airport. The crew spent the next 46 hours in a hotel, their activities being unknown. However, in the early morning of 9 February, a witness stated that everyone left the hotel in a good mood.

Departure was scheduled for 08:00 GMT, but because of inclement fog, the aircraft was delayed in Genoa and was able to land at Orio al Serio Airport in Bergamo only at 07:20. According to the flight plan, the duration of the first part of the flight was to be 4 hours and 10 minutes, landing on runway 33. It is also worth noting that in terms of flight, the airport coordinates were given as 36756 North (latitude) and 025096 West (longitude), with the runway elevation being 0 feet. Also during the investigation it was noted that the air navigation charts for this airport were outdated by 27 years, with the last update having been on 1 February 1962.

At 10:04, Flight 1851 departed Bergamo Airport.

Accident 
Flight 1851 had communication difficulties with air traffic controllers at high frequencies (HF), although it worked without failures on the ground. At 12:46:33, the crew contacted the Santa Maria Air Traffic Control center and reported on the passage point. . Flight 1851 was handled by a trainee air traffic controller. As the investigators later noted, phraseology was violated during the communications. The controller also used the word "point" instead of "decimal," meaning a decimal point. Radio communication with the land was conducted mainly by first officer Adcock, with the exception at 13:43:57 when flight engineer Gonzalez requested a weather report. At 13:44:20 the controller transmitted: "One eight five one wind two six zero... Fourteen ah fourteen knots maximum two four knots visibility more than ten kilometers one octa at one two zero zero feet six octa at three thousand feet ah temperature one seven QNH one zero one niner." During the transmission, the controller used non-standard terminology "at" in the sentence, "one octant for one two zero zero." Due to the communication difficulties, the crew heard the message as "one octant two two zero zero," from which they falsely determined that there were no clouds below 2,000 feet.

At 13:56:47, when flight 1851 was performing a descent to the airfield and passing , the controller dispatched: "Independent Air one eight five one roger you're cleared to three thousand feet on QNH one zero two seven and ah runway will be one niner." The controller made a major error during this transmission. He had reported to the crew about the reduced pressure of 1027 hPa, when it was actually 1018.7, (rounded 1018), which is 9 hPa lower. The instructor noticed this and wanted to transmit the correct information to the crew, but he was distracted by a phone call. Also, the crew members themselves failed to notice the transfer of high pressure, which 12 minutes earlier was much lower. This could have been facilitated by the presence of a flight attendant in the cockpit, whose voice was recorded by the Cockpit Voice Recorder (CVR) at 13:48:30 and at 14:04:09.

At 13:56:59 the co-pilot told the controller: "We're cleared to two thousand feet and ah...," but paused mid-sentence at 13:57:02. At that same time Daugherty said, "Make it three [thousand]." Then 13:57:07 Adcock continued his radio transmission: "one zero two seven."

At 14:03 Adcock stated, "Ah after two thousand yeah we'll get below these clouds." Adcock asked Daugherty if he needed help, but he replied, "no." As a result radio altimeter then gave a warning signal and then the Ground Proximity Warning System (GPWS) activated, sounding several "whoop whoop pull up" audible alarms, but the crew did not respond to warnings.

The impact occurred on the east side of the mountain. The majority of debris was on this side of the mountain, though several portions of debris were also found on the western slope of the mountain as the initial impact site was near the summit. All 144 people (7 crew members and 137 passengers) on board were killed. This is the deadliest aviation disaster to occur in Portugal and the fourth deadliest involving a Boeing 707.

Investigation 

The altimeters found at the crash site had an exhibited pressure of 1028 and 1026 hPa, and their height read .

During that transmission, a trainee controller had also transmitted an incorrect QNH (barometric altimeter setting) that was 9 hPa too high. The approach instructions were not fully heard since the pilot had re-keyed his microphone to acknowledge the new QNH, and likely did not hear the second repeat of the 3,000 ft safe altitude, declaring:  "We're re-cleared to 2,000 feet..." (610 m). Although the first officer questioned the barometric altitude, the captain agreed that the first officer had heard the read-back correctly.

After having been cleared to the ILS approach, the crew failed to accomplish the approach briefing, missing an opportunity to notice the 3,000 ft minimum safe altitude and the presence of Pico Alto.

There was no evidence of any in-flight emergency and the altimeter was found correctly set to 1027 mb.

Conclusions 

Other factors:

 Bad communications techniques on the part of the co-pilot and controller, including the non-adherence to standard phraseology in some of the ground communication.
 Neglecting aerodrome control tower procedures in not requesting a readback of the descent clearance.
 The limited international flying experience of the crew and the airline's deficient crew training that did not include emergency maneuvering techniques for terrain avoidance.
 Non-compliance with the National Institute of Civil Aviation of Portugal Aeronautical Information Publications (flight plan procedures and authorized routes).

Lawsuit 
In 1992, a group of next-of-kin claimed Independent Air and the lessor of the aircraft, International Air Leases, were responsible for the loss of their relatives and sought compensation. In the court cases that followed, Independent Air was judged to have acted negligently based on the following statement:

The case was settled for $34,000,000.

In popular culture 
The crash was featured in season 23, episode 2 of the Canadian documentary series Mayday, titled "Mixed Signals".

References

Further reading

External links
 
Final accident report - DGAC  - Report document
 Photos of N7231T at Airliners.net
 Independent Air Boeing 707 CVR Readout (Archive)
 

Aviation accidents and incidents in 1989
Airliner accidents and incidents involving controlled flight into terrain
Airliner accidents and incidents caused by pilot error
Aviation accidents and incidents caused by air traffic controller error
Aviation accidents and incidents in Portugal
Accidents and incidents involving the Boeing 707
1851
Azores
1989 in Portugal
February 1989 events in Europe
Pages with unreviewed translations
1989 disasters in Portugal